The 2000–01 Luxembourg Cup was the eighth playing of the Luxembourg Cup ice hockey tournament. Three teams participated in the tournament, which was won by Galaxians d'Amneville II.

Final standings

External links 
 Season on hockeyarchives.info

Luxembourg Cup
Luxembourg Cup (ice hockey) seasons